Ralph Goings (May 9, 1928 – September 4, 2016) was an American painter closely associated with the Photorealism movement of the late 1960s and early 1970s. He was best known for his highly detailed paintings of hamburger stands, pick-up trucks, and California banks, portrayed in a deliberately objective manner.

Biography

Early life 

Goings was born to a working-class family in Corning, California and grew up during the Great Depression. He was exposed to art and painting in a freshman high-school art class, and inspired by his discovery of Rembrandt at his local library. His aunt encouraged him to draw, and bought him books and instructional materials. He began painting using paint from the local hardware store, and old bed sheets when canvas was unavailable.

Education 

After he served in the military, he enrolled in Hartnell College, in Salinas, California and was approached and encouraged to attend art school by Leon Amyx, who was the head of the art department at Hartnell at that time and a well-known painter.
Goings studied art at the California College of Arts and Crafts in Oakland. During his studies at California College of the Arts, he studied along other painters from the Photorealist Movement including Robert Bechtle and Richard Mclean as well as other artists including Nathan Oliveira
He received his MFA in painting from Sacramento State College in 1965.

He was inspired by artists such as Wayne Thiebaud, Johannes Vermeer, Thomas Eakins. His interest in Photorealism sparked after being thoroughly disappointed with the quality of the pop art imagery at the time, he felt that if something was to represent an object then why not make it resemble a photograph as closely as possible.

Work 
Goings helped to define the Photorealist Movement along with Robert Bechtle, Robert Cottingham, Audrey Flack, Don Eddy, and Richard Estes.

"In 1963 I wanted to start painting again but I decided I wasn't going to do abstract pictures". It occurred to me that I should go as far to the opposite as I could. ... It occurred to me that projecting and tracing the photograph instead of copying it freehand would be even more shocking. To copy a photograph literally was considered a bad thing to do. It went against all of my art school training... some people were upset by what I was doing and said 'it's not art, it can't possibly be art'. That gave me encouragement in a perverse way, because I was delighted to be doing something that was really upsetting people... I was having a hell of a lot of fun..." (edited quote from Realists at Work)

References

External links 
Artist's website
Ralph Goings at the OK Harris Gallery
Ralph Goings at Artnet
Ralph Goings signed prints on Artnet/Dumbo Auctions, Affiliate of Rare Posters
 Oral Interview
obituary

1928 births
2016 deaths
20th-century American painters
American male painters
21st-century American painters
Painters from California
California College of the Arts alumni
People from Tehama County, California
Photorealist artists
Hartnell College alumni
20th-century American male artists